Khotoch is a rural locality (a selo) in Gunibsky District, Republic of Dagestan, Russia. The population was 1,172 as of 2010.

Geography 
Khotoch is located 6 km north of Gunib (the district's administrative centre) by road. Khindakh and Gunib are the nearest rural localities.

Nationalities 
Avars live there.

References 

Rural localities in Gunibsky District